Japan competed at the 2015 World Championships in Athletics in Beijing, China, from 22–30 August 2015.

Medalists
The following Japanese competitors won medals at the Championships

Results
(q – qualified, NM – no mark, SB – season best)

Men
Track and road events

Field events

Combined events – Decathlon

Women 
Track and road events

Field events

Sources 
Japanese team

Nations at the 2015 World Championships in Athletics
World Championships in Athletics
Japan at the World Championships in Athletics